RNLB Manchester Unity of Oddfellows (B-702) was an  lifeboat rigid-inflatable inshore lifeboat on station at the English coastal town of Sheringham in the county of Norfolk in the United Kingdom.  The boat was a permanent replacement for the  lifeboat  which served at Sheringham from 29 January 1994.

Funding and new equipment 
Manchester Unity of Oddfellows was the very first Atlantic 75-class of lifeboat to be placed on permanent service at an RNLI station in the United Kingdom, reinforcing the faith and investment in the continuing future of the Sheringham station. The new lifeboat was built at a cost of £61,000 and this was funded by the Independent Order of Oddfellows, Manchester Unity, who through this new boat maintained their strong link with the Sheringham branch of the RNLI. The organisation had, in the past, funded the long serving  lifeboat . The Oddfellows also funded a new powerful tractor to launch the new lifeboat. The tractor, a Talus four wheel drive hydrostatic mode TW24H (registration No. K313 ENT) cost the sum of £147,000. To launch, the new tractor would propel the lifeboat on its carriage trailer, reversing down to the beach on the concrete slipway and pull it back up on retrieval.

Description
The Atlantic 75-class superseded the Atlantic 21-class. The name Atlantic is derived from Atlantic College in Wales, where the rigid inflatable B-class was first developed. A significant improvement to this class over the 21 is the addition of a ballast tank installed at the front of the lifeboat which enables the craft to launch into larger surf than the previous class. The ballast when full, either of sea water or water from a hose, weighs the same as three fully grown men. The design incorporates twin outboard engines which are completely waterproofed, even if totally immersed. The hull of the lifeboat is constructed from Glass Reinforced plastic with a hypalon coated polyester which is highly resistant attack by marine organisms, chemicals and temperature extremes. The lifeboat had a displacement of 1.6 tonnes. Her equipment included two VHF radios, First Aid Kit & oxygen, GPS navigation system, night vision equipment, self-righting system, anchor and various warps, toolkit, towing system, illuminating and distress pyrotechnics, spotlight, torches. The rollbar assembly installed above the engines contains a self-righting bag which was operated by a member of the crew activating a gas bottle.

Service 
Manchester Unity of Oddfellows first service took place on 1 April 1994 when she was launched to assist local fishing boats. In gusting winds of up to force nine, heavy rain and in poor visibility. The fishing boats had been caught out by the weather. Two of the boats had managed to make it back to shore. The third was called Alison Cathleen with one man aboard. The vessel had turned head to wind but her engine was working on a reduced power. The lifeboat took her into tow and beached her safely.

Relief Lifeboats 
During the period of Manchester Unity of Oddfellows service at Sheringham, she was relieved five times by reserve Atlantic 75-class lifeboats. Three of these periods the  took up station as relief.

Rescue and service 
This record includes of the relief lifeboats during the period of service of Manchester Unity of Oddfellows (B-702)
  RNLB Susan Peacock (B-700)
  RNLB Vera Skilton (B-705)
  RNLB Eva Pank (B-756)

References 

Sheringham lifeboats
Manchester
Atlantic 75-class lifeboats